Farah Mahbub (born 27 May 1966) is a Bangladeshi justice of the High Court Division.

Early life and education 
Farah Mahbub's father, Mahbubur Rahman, is a senior advocate in the Supreme Court & former minister of Bangladesh. Farah Mahbub passed SSC from Viqarunnisa Noon School and College in 1983 and HSC from Holy Cross College in 1985. She completed her undergraduate degree and post graduation in law from the University of Dhaka.

Career 
Farah Mahbub was enrolled as an advocate of the District Court on 15 September 1992. After her success in district court, she was  enlisted in the High Court Division and the Appellate Division of the Bangladesh Supreme Court on 9 April 1994, and 15 May 2002, respectively. She was elevated as additional judge of the High Court Division on 23 August 2004, and appointed as a judge of the same Division on 23 August 2006. She will retire on 26 May 2033.

Personal life 
Mahbub married Shahriar Sayeed Hussain in 1992. They have one daughter named Fareesah. Her mother Feroza Mahbub died on 29 November 2015.

See also 
 Muhammad Habibur Rahman
 Latifur Rahman
 Khatun Sapnara
 Abu Sadat Mohammad Sayem

References

External links 
 Judges' List: High Court Division  Name and Short Biography

Living people
1966 births
University of Dhaka alumni
People from Noakhali District
Bangladeshi women judges
20th-century Bangladeshi lawyers
21st-century Bangladeshi lawyers